Katy Louise Richards (born October 26, 1998 in Essex, England) is a British  Commercial, Fitness and Lingerie model. Represented by agencies in London, Glasgow, and Los Angeles. She was originally scouted at the age of 14 by Models 1 then later signed by American-based FHM & Maxim model Rosie Roff's agency Shaffer & Roff. Richards also became a leading model for the UK based agency RMG in 2014.

Early life and Career 
Richards grew up in the small town of Leigh-on-Sea, Essex and completed academic studies in musical theatre at the Tring Park School for the Performing Arts before embarking on her career as a model. She won a contract with UK agency Models 1 whilst attending BINTM Live, beating hundreds of girls in a bid to become a new face. Her career has also seen her appear in magazines such as Vogue Japan, Man About Town, and Sunday Express. She has also made a host of promotional appearances, been featured in a number of shoots for fashion brands; including ASOS.com and Next; and in 2014 featured in the Bodog campaign with Pin-up model Ellis Cooper and Britain & Ireland's Next Top Model contestant Emily Garner. In 2015 she went on to feature in advertisements for Boots Health and Beauty, Magazine, Boohoo.com and Men's Health.

References 

1996 births
Living people
English female models